Abae or ABAE may refer to:
 Abae, an ancient town of Greece
 Amateur Boxing Association of England, now England Boxing
 Bolivarian Agency for Space Activities, the space agency of Venezuela